Black Diamond is a former town in the Calgary Metropolitan Region of Alberta, Canada within the Town of Diamond Valley. It is at the intersection of Highway 22 (Cowboy Trail) and Highway 7. Its first post office opened in 1907. Black Diamond was so named because of coal deposits near the original town site.

It was a sister town to Turner Valley, and has a hospital, shops, hotels and residences, elementary school (K-6th grade), high school (7th-12th grade), hockey rink and a Boys and Girls Club.  Little oil or gas remains.

Black Diamond is located in the foothills of the Canadian Rockies in the midst of some of Canada's best ranch country.

A  trail next to the roadway between Black Diamond and Turner Valley is named the Friendship Trail.

History  
Black Diamond incorporated as a village on May 8, 1929. After nearly 26 years as a village, Black Diamond incorporated as a town on January 1, 1956. On January 1, 2023, the Town of Black Diamond amalgamated with its neighbouring Town of Turner Valley to form the Town of Diamond Valley.

Demographics 

In the 2016 Census of Population conducted by Statistics Canada, the Town of Black Diamond recorded a population of 2,700 living in 1,098 of its 1,108 total private dwellings, a  change from its 2011 population of 2,373.

Government 
Black Diamond was governed by a town council of seven including a mayor and six councillors. The final mayor of the Town of Black Diamond was Brendan Kelly.

Since January 1, 2023, the area of Black Diamond is governed by the Diamond Valley Town Council.

Gallery

See also 
 Black Diamond (Oilfields General Hospital) Heliport
 Black Diamond/Cu Nim Airport
 Black Diamond/Flying R Ranch Aerodrome
List of communities in Alberta
List of former urban municipalities in Alberta

References

External links 

1929 establishments in Alberta
2023 disestablishments in Alberta
Calgary Region
Former towns in Alberta